Clune Park Church Of Scotland, Robert Street, Port Glasgow is a disused church in the town of Port Glasgow, Scotland. It is located on the partly abandoned Clune Park Estate and was originally built in 1905 for use by the then-new estate. It was in use for a while until 1997 when it was closed for unknown reasons and left abandoned since. The estate it is on has since declined and is in the process of being possibly regenerated. This means the entire estate would be demolished and rebuilt for social housing under Inverclyde Council's masterplan for the area and this was approved. However, the church would not be demolished due to it being a listed building under category B and is currently for sale.

See also
List of listed buildings in Port Glasgow, Inverclyde

References

Churches completed in 1905
20th-century Church of Scotland church buildings